Lisa is a small village located in Ifo Local Government Area of Ogun State, Nigeria. Occupied immensely by the Egba people, the village rely mainly on farming as a means of survival. On 22 October 2005, Lisa came into worldwide recognition after a Boeing 737-200 aircraft crashed in the village killing all 117 people on board.

References

Populated places in Ogun State